Juliana Emma Linter was a British conchologist and collector, donated the Linter collection to the Royal Albert Memorial Museum & Art Gallery.

Early life 
Juliana Emma Linter was born in Teignmouth on 19 July 1844 to parents William Brine Linter, a musician, and Caroline Mary Nicholls. Juliana was the fourth of six children and the only daughter of William and Caroline.

As a young girl, Juliana lived at 6 Saxe Street in Teignmouth but left at an early age for London to study. Juliana was a regular reader at the British Museum for many years. The age at which Juliana left her parents is unknown, but census records from 1871, when Juliana was 26 years old, show she was not living with her parents in Teignmouth. As an adult, Juliana first appears on the census in 1881, at 36 years old and residing in Grosvenor Road, Twickenham, London, where she is registered as a "biological student", though not formally enrolled in any college or university.

Shell collection 
Juliana Linter started collecting shell specimens in the 1880's. The core of Juliana's initial collection came from William Theobald and also the collection of Colonel Skinner.

Juliana Linter was elected a member of the Malacological Society of London in 1895, though reported to have rarely attended meetings.

Later life and death 
Juliana Linter never married, and following two years of ill health, Juliana died on 30 August 1909.

References 

1844 births
1909 deaths
Conchologists
People from Teignmouth